Coleman C. Pressley (born October 10, 1988) is an American former professional stock car racing driver. He is the current spotter of the No. 22 Ford Mustang driven by Joey Logano in the NASCAR Cup Series. He is also the son of former NASCAR Cup driver Robert Pressley and the grandson of Bob Pressley. He won the UARA Stars Championship in 2010.

Early career
Coleman began racing in karts as a 6-year-old. He then raced Bandoleros at Lowes Motor Speedway. Pressley raced in legends cars before taking a year off. In 2005 when he began racing late models at Hickory Motor Speedway. He had four second-place finishes to finish sixth in season points. In 2006, he continued racing at Hickory with additional events at other tracks. He scored his first late model victory in the second race of the season at Hickory. With the victory, he began the youngest driver to win in the track's 55-year history.
He is the cousin of former North Carolina Tar Heels quarterback and current Barstool Sports blogger Caleb Pressley.

NASCAR career
His first race in the Nationwide Series in the No. 47 JTG Daugherty Racing at the Iowa Speedway and finished 41st. He raced for R3 Motorsports part-time in the Nationwide Series. As of June 7, 2010, his best finish was a 12th-place effort at Nashville Superspeedway, driving the No. 88 JR Motorsports Chevrolet. He spent the rest of the season racing part-time in the No. 23 car.

After ending his driving career, Pressley became a spotter, starting in 2015. His first job was spotting for A. J. Allmendinger, who was driving for JTG Daugherty Racing. In 2019, he was named Brad Keselowski's spotter.

Motorsports career results

NASCAR
(key) (Bold – Pole position awarded by qualifying time. Italics – Pole position earned by points standings or practice time. * – Most laps led.)

Nationwide Series

K&N Pro Series East

References

External links
 

1988 births
Living people
NASCAR drivers
Sportspeople from Asheville, North Carolina
Racing drivers from North Carolina

JR Motorsports drivers